Armin Schwarz (born 16 July 1963) is a German rally driver. He competed in the World Rally Championship from 1988 to 2005, winning the 1991 Rally Catalunya and taking six other podium finishes. Outside the WRC, he won the German Rally Championship (1987–88), the European Rally Championship (1996) and the "Rally Masters" event at the Race of Champions (2000).

Career

Schwarz was born in Neustadt an der Aisch in Franken in 1963 and debuted in rallying in 1983. After having won the German Rally Championship for two years in a row, he made his debut in the World Rally Championship in 1988 and was signed by Toyota Team Europe, Toyota's factory WRC team, for the 1990 season.

Driving a Toyota Celica GT-Four, Schwarz led a world championship rally for the first time at the 1990 Rally Portugal, took his first podium finish at the 1991 Rally Australia and his first and only win at the 1991 Rally Catalunya.

In 1996, due to Toyota's 12-month ban from the WRC, Schwarz drove for the team in the European Rally Championship. He won the Manx International Rally and the Cyprus Rally and captured the overall title. Later that same year, he drove to victory in the RAC Rally, then part of the 2-Litre World Championship ("Formula 2").

In 1997 Schwarz drove for the now Cumbria based M-Sport Ford rally team but was later replaced by Juha Kankkunen after a series of disappointing performances.

In the 1999 season, after stints with Mitsubishi and Ford, Schwarz started his long partnership with the debuting Škoda works team. His best result with the team was third place at the 2001 Safari Rally. Schwarz retired from the world championship after the 2005 season, during which he took his first points finish in over a year at the season-ending Rally Australia.

Following the successful completion of its Red Bull Young Rally Driver's Search Program, Schwarz joined forces in 2006 with Global Sport Licensing Ltd. (“GSL”) and Mr. Baumschlage to create the WRC designated Red Bull Škoda Team. Simultaneously, Schwarz started in 2007 to race, as a GSL racing driver with the support of California-based All German Motorsport team, in the American SCORE International off-road championship which includes among others the internationally famous races Baja 1000.

Schwarz now lives in Austria. He is married with two children.

WRC victories

Complete World Rally Championship results

References

External links

Official website

1963 births
German rally drivers
World Rally Championship drivers
European Rally Championship drivers
Living people
Toyota Gazoo Racing drivers
Nürburgring 24 Hours drivers
Racing drivers from Bavaria
Hyundai Motorsport drivers
Škoda Motorsport drivers